Rancho Solano Preparatory School is a PK-12 school in Scottsdale, Arizona. It was founded in 2008 as the first high school program of its owner, Rancho Solano Private Schools.

It is one of the newest members of the Arizona Interscholastic Association.

References

Private high schools in Arizona
Education in Scottsdale, Arizona